A Gunman Has Escaped is a 1948 British crime film directed by Richard M. Grey and starring John Harvey, Maria Charles and Jane Arden. It was produced as a second feature and shot at the Maida Vale Studios in London. It was released by the independent distributor Monarch Film Corporation.

Cast
 John Harvey as Eddie Steele
 John Fitzgerald as Sinclair
 Robert Cartland as 	Bill Grant
 Ernest Brightmore as 	Johnson
 Maria Charles as Goldie
 Patrick Westwood as 	Red
 George Self as 	Spike
 Manville Tarrant as 	Alf
 Denis Lehrer as 	Mike
 Jane Arden as Jane
 Frank Hawkins as 	Mr. Cranston
 Hope Carr as 	Mrs. Cranston
 Melville Crawford as 	Inspector Fenton
 Hatton Duprez as Detective

References

Bibliography
 Chibnall, Steve & McFarlane, Brian. The British 'B' Film. Palgrave MacMillan, 2009.

External links
 

1948 films
1948 crime films
British crime films
Films set in London
Films shot in London
1940s English-language films
1940s British films